Stomatochaeta is a genus of South American plants in the family Asteraceae.

 Species
 Stomatochaeta acuminata Pruski - Venezuela
 Stomatochaeta condensata (Baker) Maguire & Wurdack - Venezuela, Guyana, Roraima
 Stomatochaeta crassifolia (S.F.Blake) Maguire & Wurdack - Venezuela
 Stomatochaeta cylindrica Maguire & Wurdack - Venezuela
 Stomatochaeta cymbifolia (S.F.Blake) Maguire & Wurdack - Venezuela
 Stomatochaeta steyermarkii Aristeg. - Venezuela

 formerly included
see Stenopadus 
 Stomatochaeta colveei - Stenopadus colveei

References

Wunderlichioideae
Asteraceae genera
Flora of South America